James Craft "Lefty" Akard (January 17, 1917 – March 27, 2015) was an American politician in the state of Tennessee. Akard served in the Tennessee House of Representatives from 1981 to 1982. He was a former educator, having served as Superintendent of Sullivan County Schools from 1948 to 1971, and as Field Representative for the Tennessee Board of Education from 1971 to 1979. He was elected to the Tennessee House of Representatives in 1981 as a Democrat, representing the 1st district, encompassing Sullivan County. He did not run for reelection upon the expiration of his term, stating, "to be perfectly honest, I don't believe I can be an effective legislator because the role is not in keeping with my background and temperament".

He graduated from Emory & Henry College in 1938, where he played baseball and basketball. He later played professional baseball for the Johnson City Soldiers, Bristol Twins, Kingsport Cherokees and Newport Canners of the Appalachian League, with his career lasting from 1938 to 1945. He and his wife Margaret had two children. He died in 2015.

References

1917 births
2015 deaths
Democratic Party members of the Tennessee House of Representatives
Emory and Henry College alumni
People from Blountville, Tennessee
Emory and Henry Wasps baseball players